Come Through is a 1917 American silent crime film directed by Jack Conway and starring Alice Lake, Jean Hathaway, and Herbert Rawlinson.

Cast
 Alice Lake as Velma Gay 
 Jean Hathaway as Mrs. Sylvester Van Deek 
 Herbert Rawlinson as James Harrington Court, aka 'The Possum' 
 George Webb as Archie Craig 
 Roy Stewart as Buck Lindsay 
 Charles Hill Mailes as John Lysaght 
 Margaret Whistler as Mrs. Stoat 
 William J. Dyer as McGinnis

References

Bibliography
 James Robert Parish & Michael R. Pitts. Film Directors: A Guide to Their American Films. Scarecrow Press, 1974.

External links

1917 films
1917 crime films
1910s English-language films
American silent feature films
American crime films
Films directed by Jack Conway
American black-and-white films
Universal Pictures films
1910s American films